Fabrice Santoro was the defending champion but lost in the first round to Gianluca Pozzi.

Marcelo Ríos won in the final 6–3, 2–6, 6–3 against Bohdan Ulihrach.

Seeds

  Yevgeny Kafelnikov (quarterfinals)
  Nicolas Kiefer (quarterfinals)
  Sjeng Schalken (second round)
  Younes El Aynaoui (first round)
  Marc Rosset (second round)
  Hicham Arazi (quarterfinals)
  Fabrice Santoro (first round)
  Gastón Gaudio (first round)

Draw

Finals

Top half

Bottom half

Qualifying

Seeds

  Juan Balcells (second round)
  Bohdan Ulihrach (Qualifier)
  Attila Sávolt (second round)
  Nicolas Coutelot (Qualifier)
  Ján Krošlák (second round)
  Filippo Volandri (second round)
  Lars Burgsmüller (first round)
  Juan Albert Viloca (final round)

Qualifiers

  Fredrik Jonsson
  Bohdan Ulihrach
  Nenad Zimonjić
  Nicolas Coutelot

Draw

First qualifier

Second qualifier

Third qualifier

Fourth qualifier

External links
 2001 Qatar Open draw
 2001 Qatar Open Singles Qualifying draw

2001 Qatar Open
Singles
Qatar Open (tennis)